Orthwein is a surname. Notable people with the surname include:

Charles F. Orthwein (1839–1898), German-born American businessman.
William D. Orthwein (1841–1925), German-born American businessman.
Frederick C. Orthwein (1871–1927), American businessman.
William R. Orthwein (1881–1955), American water polo player, attorney.
Percy Orthwein (1888–1957), American businessman
William R. Orthwein Jr. (1917–2011), American businessman and philanthropist.
Adolphus Busch Orthwein (1917–2013), American heir and business executive
James Orthwein (1924–2008), American heir and businessman
Stephen A. Orthwein (1945–2018), American heir and polo player.
Peter Busch Orthwein, American heir, businessman, polo player

See also
Orthwein Mansion, a historic mansion in St. Louis, Missouri, USA.